WSHR (91.9 FM, "91.9 The Arrow") is a radio station licensed to Lake Ronkonkoma, New York. The station is owned by the Sachem School District and operates with assistance from a grant by the U.S. Department of Education. It broadcasts out of both Sachem High School East and Sachem High School North.  This school district owned radio station can be heard throughout central and western Suffolk County and parts of Nassau County.

On May 28, 2010, WSHR switched formats from a Jazz and Variety mix to Contemporary Hit Radio as "91.9 The Arrow."

References

External links 

 

SHR
Mass media in Suffolk County, New York